The Big Siskiwit River is an  river on Isle Royale in Lake Superior, in the U.S. state of Michigan. It flows west to east in the southern part of the island, entering Lake Superior at Siskiwit Bay.

See also
List of rivers of Michigan

References

Michigan  Streamflow Data from the USGS
Big Siskiwit River, USGS feature query

Rivers of Michigan
Rivers of Keweenaw County, Michigan
Tributaries of Lake Superior
Isle Royale National Park